Monika Aleksandra Zuchniak-Pazdan (born 1 July 1974, in Nowy Sącz) is a Polish diplomat; an ambassador to Albania (since 2021).

Life 
Monika Zuchniak-Pazdan attended high school in Nowy Sącz. She graduated from marketing (1999) and international relations and diplomacy (2001) at Wyższa Szkoła Biznesu – National-Louis University.

In 2000, she began her career at the public administration as an intern at the Chancellery of the Prime Minister of Poland. In 2002, she joined the Ministry of Culture. Later, she returned to Nowy Sącz to work as a lecturer at her alma mater. Following her work for the chancellery of the Sejm, in 2003 she joined the Ministry of Foreign Affairs of Poland as a deputy director of the Promotion Department. In 2006, she became consul general in Varna, Bulgaria. Two years later, she finished her term, closing the consulate. Later, she was heading the consular sections at the embassies in: Ottawa, Tallinn, Beirut, Riga, Vilnius. In 2018, she became at first acting director, and then director of the Director General's Office. In October 2020, she was accepted by the parliament as an ambassador to Albania and appointed by the President following month. She began her term on 1 April 2021.

In 2019, she was awarded Silver Cross of Merit.

Zuchniak-Pazdan is a widow, mother of 1 daughter.

References 

1974 births
Ambassadors of Poland to Albania
Consuls-General of Poland
Living people
People from Nowy Sącz
Polish women ambassadors
Recipients of the Silver Cross of Merit (Poland)